Thomas Fuller (1608–1661) was an English religious leader and historian.

Thomas Fuller may also refer to:

 Thomas Fuller (architect) (1823–1898), Canadian architect
 Thomas Fuller (bishop) (1810–1884), Anglican bishop in Canada
 Thomas Fuller (mental calculator) (1710–1790), enslaved African renowned for his mathematical abilities
 Thomas Fuller (Massachusetts politician), representative to the Great and General Court
 Thomas Fuller (writer) (1654–1734), British writer, physician and religious leader 
 Thomas Charles Fuller (1832–1901), American judge
 Thomas Ekins Fuller (1831–1910), MP and newspaper editor of the Cape Colony
 Thomas G. Fuller (1909–1994), Canadian naval officer
 Thomas Horace Fuller (c. 1816–1861), lawyer and political figure in Nova Scotia
 Thomas J. D. Fuller (1808–1876), American politician
 Thomas W. Fuller (1865–1951), Canadian architect
 Thomas Wafer Fuller (1867–1920), educator, newspaperman and member of the Louisiana State Senate